Kikuh or Keykuh may refer to:
 Kikuh, Mazandaran
 Keykuh, Yazd